The Height of Callousness is the second album by the American industrial metal band Spineshank. It was released on October 10, 2000 by Roadrunner Records. The title is taken from a phrase in A Clockwork Orange.

Reception

Allmusic gave the album 2.5 stars out of 5 but praised the band's energy, saying that "The Height of Callousness is a super-charged silver bullet of 11 aggressive tracks that will get your blood flowing as if you're engaged in a stock car race gone haywire." CMJ described the album as: "Machine-charged cybercore with computerized samples aligning the band with the likes of Fear Factory and Rammstein". The album has sold over 150,000 units.

Track listing

Note: On the American version of the digipak release, track 15 was changed from "The Height of Callousness" (Fist Fuck Integrity mix) to "Asthmatic" (Punctured Lung mix).

Personnel
Spineshank
 Jonny Santos – vocals
 Mike Sarkisyan – guitar, co-producer
 Robert Garcia – bass, backing vocals
 Tommy Decker – drums, electronics, co-producer

Production
 GGGarth – Producer
 Ted Jensen – Mastering
 Andre "The German" Wahl – Engineering
 Scott Ternan – Assistant engineer
 Anthony "Fu" Valcic - programming
 Frank Gryner – Mixing, Additional recording, Additional programming
 Scott Humphrey – Mixing, Additional recording, Additional programming
 Amir Derakh - song arrangement
 Dan Burns – Assistant mixer
 Ben "Hairy Toes" Kaplan – Digital editing
 Alex "The Condor" Aligizakis – Assistant digital editor

Chart positions

Album

Single(s)

References

2000 albums
Roadrunner Records albums
Spineshank albums
Albums produced by Garth Richardson